Miloš Mrvaljević (born 13 February 1989) is a Montenegrin footballer who plays for Njegoš Lovćenac.

Club career
Having started his senior career in 2006 playing for the Serbian SuperLiga club OFK Beograd, he only got one appearance due to strong competition, and it was in the first season. Because of that, he decided to change and was loaned, in January 2009, to another SuperLiga club FK Hajduk Kula. Despite having been born in the Serbian capital city Belgrade, he has played for the youth squads of Montenegro, and is regarded as a very talented and prospective player. Since summer 2009, he'll be playing on loan in the Serbian First League club FK Mladost Apatin.

External links
 Profile and stats at Srbijafudbal

1989 births
Living people
Footballers from Belgrade
Association football central defenders
Montenegrin footballers
Montenegro youth international footballers
OFK Beograd players
FK Hajduk Kula players
FK Mladost Apatin players
FK Bežanija players
FK Sloga Temerin players
Serbian SuperLiga players
Serbian First League players